TBLA may stand for:
The Biggest Loser Asia, the Asian version of the competitive reality television series The Biggest Loser
The Brave Little Abacus, an American emo band
Taboola, an American public advertising company traded as TBLA